The two arrondissements of the Rhône department are:
 Arrondissement of Lyon, (prefecture of the Rhône department: Lyon) with 135 communes (59 of these communes are in the Metropolis of Lyon). The population of the arrondissement was 1,585,411 in 2016.  
 Arrondissement of Villefranche-sur-Saône, (subprefecture: Villefranche-sur-Saône) with 132 communes. The population of the arrondissement was 250,492 in 2016.

History

In 1800 the arrondissements of Lyon and Villefranche were established. All of them is never disbanded. On 1 January 2015, 101 communes that did not join the newly created Metropolis of Lyon passed from the arrondissement of Lyon to the arrondissement of Villefranche-sur-Saône. On 1 February 2017, 78 communes passed from the arrondissement of Villefranche-sur-Saône to the arrondissement of Lyon.

References

Rhone